Usui Bridge (Japanese: 碓氷第三橋梁, うすいだいさんきょうりょう) is the largest brick-masonry arched bridge in Japan, located over Usui river in Gunma prefecture. The bridge was built in 1892 for Usui railway line to travel between Yokokawa in Gunma prefecture and Karuizawa in Nagano prefecture.

Following electrification of the Shin'etsu Main Line, a new line was constructed in 1963.

In 2001, it formed a part of walkway trail.  

The bridge is also called Megane bashi meaning spectacles bridge because of its arch shape.

Bus routes
JR BUS KANTO Usui Line
For Karuizawa Station
For Yokokawa Station
This bus route passes through Megane-bashi bus stop located near this bridge during autumn.

References

Bridges in Japan